Mariotti may refer to
Mariotti (surname)
The Mariotti Show, a web radio show launched by Jay Mariotti
7972 Mariotti, a minor planet 
Stadio Mariotti in Italy